Đinh Thị Hảo (born 15 November 1997) is a Vietnamese rower. She competed in the women's lightweight double sculls event at the 2020 Summer Olympics.

References

External links
 

1997 births
Living people
Vietnamese female rowers
Olympic rowers of Vietnam
Rowers at the 2020 Summer Olympics
People from Tuyên Quang province
Asian Games silver medalists for Vietnam
Asian Games medalists in rowing
Rowers at the 2018 Asian Games
Medalists at the 2018 Asian Games
21st-century Vietnamese women
20th-century Vietnamese women